Rajpipla is a town and a municipality in the Narmada district in the Indian state of Gujarat.

It was the capital of the former Kingdom of Rajpipla.

Geography
It has an average elevation of 148 metres (485 feet).

History

Rajpipla was known as Nandipuri during the rule of Gurjara kings, when it was the capital of the Lata kingdom. A later form of the name Nandol and Nandod have also been in use in medieval times.

Demographics
 India census, Rajpipla had a population of 34,923. Males constitute 51% of the population and females 49%. Rajpipla has an average literacy rate of 97%, higher than the national average of 59.5%: male literacy is 92%, and female literacy is 91%. In Rajpipla, 10% of the population is under 6 years of age. Rajpipla is one of the most literate towns of Gujarat.

References

External links
 Shri-Harsiddhi-Mataji-Temple
Rajpipla - Princely State
 Open library resource 
 Playne, Somerset; Solomon, R. V. ; Bond, J. W.; Wright, Arnold; Indian States
Rajpipla State Post - Postal History of Rajpipla State

Cities and towns in Narmada district